Esporte Clube Ypiranga is a football team of Salvador, Bahia. Its colours are yellow and black.

With 10 titles of the Campeonato Baiano, it has the third-most titles in the Bahia state championship, coming behind Vitória and Bahia, with 27 and 45 titles, respectively.

History
Esporte Clube Ypiranga was founded on 7 September 1906, originating itself from Sport Club Sete de Setembro, founded on 17 April 1904. it is one of the oldest football teams in Bahia.

The team participated in the Campeonato Baiano for the first time in 1914, finishing in third place. Eventually, the team won its first title in 1917, finishing the championship without losing a match. After that, the team won another nine titles, the latest of them in 1951.  Despite being one of the most traditional teams in Bahia, Ypiranga has not participated in the Campeonato Brasileiro at any level.  Ypiranga eventually was relegated to the Second Division of the Campeonato Baiano in 1999 and has not been promoted back into the first division ever since.

Achievements

Regional
 Torneio dos Campeões do Norte-Nordeste: 1951.

State championships
Campeonato Baiano:
Winner (10): (1917*, 1918*, 1920, 1921*, 1925*, 1928*, 1929*, 1932*, 1939 and 1951.)
Runners-up (10): (1915, 1924, 1926, 1927, 1931, 1933, 1937, 1938, 1946 and 1949.)
Campeonato Baiano Second Division: 2 times (1983, 1990*).
Torneio Início Winner (8): (1919, 1922, 1929, 1933, 1947, 1956, 1959 e 1963).

* being an unbeaten champion.

External links

Official Site

References

Sport in Salvador, Bahia
Football clubs in Bahia